Kaolinovo Municipality is a municipality (obshtina) in Shumen Province, Northeastern Bulgaria, located in the Ludogorie geographical region, part of the Danubian Plain. It is named after its administrative centre – the town of Kaolinovo.

Settlements 

Kaolinovo Municipality includes the following 16 places (towns are shown in bold):

Demography 
The following table shows the change of the population during the last four decades.

Ethnic composition
According to the 2011 census, among those who answered the optional question on ethnic identification, the ethnic composition of the municipality was the following:

More than three-quarters of the population of Kaolinovo Municipality consists of ethnic Turks. The second largest ethnic group are the Turkish-speaking Roma people with one in seven people. Bulgarians make up a very small minority.

Religion 
According to the latest Bulgarian census of 2011, the religious composition, among those who answered the optional question on religious identification, was the following:

The municipality of Kaolinovo has one of the highest concentrations of Muslims in Bulgaria.

Demographic situation 
The municipality of Kaolinovo had relatively favourable demographic indicators compared to other areas in Bulgaria, although it has become more worse with the day.

See also
Provinces of Bulgaria
Municipalities of Bulgaria
List of cities and towns in Bulgaria

References

External links
 Official website 

Municipalities in Shumen Province